Rupert Perry   is a high-ranking member of the EMI Record Corporation. After joining EMI Music in 1971, he was given various promotions. 1976 earned him a title as Vice President of Artist and repertoire for Capitol Records in the US. 1982 landed him a position as President of EMI America. From 1986-1995, Perry served as President of EMI Records UK, followed by a promotion to President of EMI Europe until 1999, when he became Senior Worldwide Vice President of EMI Music. He has received various awards for serving the world's music industry including a CBE in the Queen's Honour List and the IFPI Medal  for international service to the industry.

References

External links
 http://www.emimusicsoundfoundation.com/biog_rupertperry.html

Living people
Commanders of the Order of the British Empire
Capitol Records
EMI
Year of birth missing (living people)